Terran Campbell (born October 10, 1998) is a Canadian professional soccer player who currently plays for Forge FC in the Canadian Premier League.

Early life
Campbell began playing soccer at age five with South Burnaby Metro Club. In 2010, he joined the Burnaby Selects SC and was also part of the British Columbia provincial U13 team. In September 2011, he joined the Vancouver Whitecaps FC Academy. After signing a professional contract with the Whitecaps second team, he continued to play with the Academy teams in 2016.

Club career
On July 31, 2015, he debuted with Whitecaps FC 2 in the USL, as an academy call-up, against the Tulsa Roughnecks. In August 2015, at age 16, he signed a professional contract with Whitecaps FC 2 in the USL. He scored his first professional goal on May 28, 2017 against the Real Monarchs.

In December 2017, Campbell joined Fresno FC in the USL for the 2018 season, who became the Whitecaps' new USL affiliate after they decided to disband the Whitecaps FC 2 team. He scored his first goal in a US Open Cup match on May 16 against Orange County FC.

In January 2019, Campbell joined Pacific FC for the inaugural season of the Canadian Premier League.  He scored his first goal for the club on June 1, 2019 against HFX Wanderers FC. He became the first player to score double-digit goals in the league. At the end of the season, he was nominated for the league's Young Player of the Year award, and finished the season second in the Golden Boot race, with 11 goals, trailing only Tristan Borges. He subsequently re-signed with the club for the 2020 season. In 2021, he won the league championship with Pacific and he was nominated for the CPL Player of the Year award. After the 2021 season, he departed the club. At the time of his departure from Pacific, he was the club's all-time leading scorer with 25 goals, while also adding 10 assists (tied for first in club's history), in 69 appearances, across all competitions.

On January 7, 2022, Pacific FC announced that Campbell had left the club to sign with fellow Canadian Premier League side Forge FC ahead of the 2022 season. Forge officially confirmed the signing to a multi-year contract the following week. He made his debut for his new club in their 2022 CONCACAF Champions League first-leg match against Cruz Azul on February 16. He scored a brace on April 23 against FC Edmonton, for his first goals with the club.

International career
In 2013, he made his debut in the Canadian program being called to a camp with the Canada U15 team. He was also named to Canada's men's U15 roster for the 2013 Copa Mexico de Naciones, where he made his national team debut.

Campbell received his first Canada U17 call-up in April 2014 and would participate in a total of six U17 preparation camps under Sean Fleming, before being named to Canada's squad for the 2015 CONCACAF U-17 Championship.

In February 2020, Campbell was named to the Canadian U23 provisional roster for the 2020 CONCACAF Men's Olympic Qualifying Championship.

Career statistics

Honours

Club
Pacific FC
Canadian Premier League: 2021
Forge FC
Canadian Premier League: 2022

References

External links

1998 births
Living people
Association football forwards
Canadian soccer players
Soccer people from British Columbia
Sportspeople from Burnaby
Canadian people of American descent
Canadian expatriate soccer players
Expatriate soccer players in the United States
Whitecaps FC 2 players
Fresno FC players
Pacific FC players
Forge FC players
USL Championship players
Canadian Premier League players
Canada men's youth international soccer players